Eligaid is a village and a mandal in Peddapalli district of Telangana, India. Eligaid is very near to Sultanabad and is accessible by Rajiv Rahadari (State Highway 1) from Katnapalli.

References 

Villages in Peddapalli district